The Sacred Heart Cultural Center, known also as Sacred Heart Catholic Church, is an events center and a former Catholic parish church located in Augusta, Georgia.

History

It was built by Jesuit priests and its first service was on December 2, 1900. The church had been in Augusta for 70 years, until it closed in 1971 due to modern suburban advancements. While the building was vacant, it endured much vandalism and was near destruction.

It was listed on the National Register of Historic Places in 1972.

In 1987, the Knox Foundation renovated the building and opened as a vibrant center of the city for cultural events.

Events
The Sacred Heart Cultural Center hosts special events such as wine festivals, choral concerts, Christmas events, and an annual garden festival. Artwork is exhibited on a regular basis in the Art Gallery.

See also

Arts and culture in Augusta, Georgia

References

External links

 Sacred Heart Cultural Center — official website
 National Park Service "Discover Our Shared Heritage" travel itinerary

Properties of religious function on the National Register of Historic Places in Augusta, Georgia
Roman Catholic churches in Georgia (U.S. state)
Culture of Augusta, Georgia
Towers in Georgia (U.S. state)
Tourist attractions in Augusta, Georgia
Churches on the National Register of Historic Places in Georgia (U.S. state)
National Register of Historic Places in Augusta, Georgia